Chief Arthur Edward Prest (10 February 1906 – 26 September 1976) was an Itsekiri politician of biracial heritage from the Warri division of southern Nigeria.

Life

Prest was born in February 1906 to a white English father from Liverpool who was a ship's captain and a colonialist, and an Itsekiri royal Nigerian mother, Princess Mami Ogbe, who was the daughter of the Olu of Warri. He was an officer in the Nigerian police force, and the first Nigerian commissioned police officer. He studied law in England, and registered at the supreme court of Nigeria in 1947, prior to his nomination as a representative of the Warri district in the Western Regional House of Assembly.

In 1950 Prest and Anthony Enahoro founded the Mid-West Party. Enahoro had already started the Mid-West Press and he published the Nigerian newspaper from 1950 to 1953. The Mid-West Party became part of the Action Group in 1951.

Prest was later made regional minister at Ibadan and was  deputy leader to Obafemi Awolowo, he was subsequently appointed federal minister for communications in 1952. Prest, Awolowo, Sir Ahmadu Bello, Anthony Enahoro and others fought for Nigeria's independence and attended the Lancaster House talks that negotiated Nigeria's independence. He left the Action Group in 1957. Prest was High Commissioner for the Federation of Nigeria to the UK.

In 1971, Prest was involved in a prominent court case. He challenged the Itsekiri Communal Lands Trust which wanted to use the purported overlord rights of the Olu of Warri over lands in Warri. The overlord rights would have given the trust indirect ownership of all lands including overriding the rights of ownership of landlords. However, the communal lands trust lost the case.

Prest was given the chieftaincy title of the Olorogun of Warri by the Olu of Warri in 1946. He also became a High Court Judge in the then Mid Western Region.

Chief Arthur Prest had a rich and full family life. He had several children, the most prominent being his first son Chief Michael Godwin Prest who became a successful lawyer, politician and Chief of Staff to Nigerian President Shehu Shagari in 1979. Chief Michael Prest had 4 children. His eldest child, (granddaughter to Arthur Prest) is Helen Prest-Ajayi, a former Miss Nigeria in 1979, lawyer, author and literacy advocate ; while his son Michael J. Prest is a trained barrister (grandson of Arthur Prest), Nigeria's first oil  trader, foremost oil and gas mogul and philanthropist. He was the architect of the landmark company law case of Prest v Petrodel Resources Ltd  taught in every law school around the world and defined the direction of company law.

Chief Arthur Prest passed away in 1976.

References

Further information
 KWJ Post, The Nigerian Federal Election of 1959: Politics & Administration in a Developing Political System. Oxford, 1963
 Richard L Sklar, Nigerian Political Parties: Power in an Emergent African Nation, Princeton, NJ, 1963
 Michael Vickers, Ethnicity & Sub-Nationalism in Nigeria: Movement for a Mid-West State, Oxford, 2000
 Michael Vickers, A Nation Betrayed: Nigeria & the Minorities Commission of 1957, Trenton, NJ, 2010

1906 births
1976 deaths
People from Warri
Itsekiri people
Action Group (Nigeria) politicians
Federal ministers of Nigeria
20th-century Nigerian lawyers
20th-century Nigerian politicians
Nigerian police officers
Nigerian people of British descent
People from colonial Nigeria